Whitney Motorsports was a NASCAR team that competed in the Sprint Cup Series. It was based in Huntersville, North Carolina.

Sprint Cup Series

Car No. 46 History

Dusty Whitney, owner of Whitney Motorsports, was involved with K-Automotive Motorsports until 2009, when he left the team and formed his own NASCAR Sprint Cup team. Whitney Motorsports began in 2010 with Rookie of the Year contender Terry Cook in the No. 46 Dodge, who was to run full-time. Cook only managed to qualify for 3 out of the first 10 races, at Bristol and at Phoenix, and left the team following Richmond. He had a best finish of 34th at Phoenix. He was replaced with J. J. Yeley, who would go on to qualify for 9 races in 14 attempts in the No. 46 entry, with a best finish of 19th at Daytona. He also ran 2 races in a second entry for Whitney Motorsports, the No. 81 Dodge. Yeley was replaced by Michael McDowell in the No. 46 entry at Atlanta, and the team would run both Chevrolets and Dodges for the remainder of the season. McDowell would qualify for 7 races in 12 attempts, with a best finish of 35th at Talladega. Sponsors that appeared during the 2010 season included Cash America, Red Line Oil, International Trucking, and Whitney Collision Center, among others. Overall, the No. 46 team made 19 races and finished five.

For 2011, Whitney Motorsports remains a full-time team.  It has been announced that Yeley would drive the No. 46 on a full-time basis. After the team failed to make the 2010 Daytona 500, Yeley raced his way into the 2011 event. The team didn't get far, as they blew an engine just 11 laps in and finished 43rd in the race.  Yeley qualified for 15 events in the No. 46 car before moving over to Front Row Motorsports, with Bill Elliott driving at Talladega and Andy Pilgrim at Sonoma.  Before New Hampshire, the team announced that they would switch manufacturers to Ford with previous Roush Fenway Racing driver Erik Darnell as the driver. Starting at Bristol Scott Speed took over the driving role replacing Erik Darnell and announced they had received sponsorship for Atlanta and Kansas.  Speed finished the year with Whitney but left for Max Q Motorsports at year's end.

Car No. 46 results

Car No. 81 History
Whitney Motorsports first ran the No. 81 at 3 events in 2010 as a Dodge. J. J. Yeley drove the car at Dover and at Martinsville, starting and parking at both events. Terry Labonte drove the car at Phoenix, also starting and parking.

In 2011, the No. 81 qualified for its first race at Kansas.  They ran the team for the remainder of the 2011 season in limited races, mainly as support for the 46 team. The No. 81 team ended operations while focused on getting the No. 46 in races.

For 2012, Whitney merged with Phil Parsons Racing to field the No. 98 Ford for Michael McDowell.

Car No. 81 results

References
 Terry Cook Career Stats
 Terry Cook to drive for Whitney Motorsports in 2010
 Jayski 46 Team Page

External links
 Official website of Terry Cook

Defunct NASCAR teams
Auto racing teams established in 2010
Auto racing teams disestablished in 2011